The 2019-20 Holy Cross Crusaders men's ice hockey season was the 56th season of play for the program, the 22nd at the Division I level, and the 17th season in the Atlantic Hockey conference. The Crusaders represented the College of the Holy Cross and were coached by David Berard, in his 6th season.

Departures

Recruiting

Roster

As of July 12, 2019.

Standings

Schedule and Results

|-
!colspan=12 style=";" | Exhibition

|-
!colspan=12 style=";" | Regular Season

|-
!colspan=12 style=";" | 

|- align="center" bgcolor="#e0e0e0"
|colspan=12|Holy Cross Lost Series 1–2

Scoring Statistics

Goaltending statistics

Rankings

References

2019–20
Holy Cross Crusaders 
Holy Cross Crusaders 
2019 in sports in Massachusetts
2020 in sports in Massachusetts